The Carnegie Museum of Natural History (abbreviated as CMNH) is a natural history museum in the Oakland neighborhood of Pittsburgh, Pennsylvania. It was founded by Pittsburgh-based industrialist Andrew Carnegie in 1896. 
Housing some 22 million specimens, the museum features one of the finest paleontological collections in the world.

Description and history
The museum consists of  organized into 20 galleries as well as research, library, and office space. It holds some 22 million specimens, of which about 10,000 are on view at any given time and about 1 million are cataloged in online databases. In 2008 it hosted 386,300 admissions and 63,000 school group visits. Museum education staff also actively engage in outreach by traveling to schools all around western Pennsylvania.

The museum gained prominence in 1899 when its scientists unearthed the fossils of Diplodocus carnegii. Notable dinosaur specimens include one of the world's very few fossils of a juvenile Apatosaurus, the world's first specimen of a Tyrannosaurus rex, and a recently identified species of oviraptorosaur named Anzu wyliei.

Research teams including former Carnegie scientists made critical discoveries such as Puijila darwini, Castorocauda lutrasimilis, and Hadrocodium wui.

Other major exhibits include Hillman Hall of Minerals and Gems, Alcoa Foundation Hall of American Indians, Polar World: Wyckoff Hall of Arctic Life, Walton Hall of Ancient Egypt, Benedum Hall of Geology, Dinosaurs in Their Time, and Powdermill Nature Reserve, established by the museum in 1956 to serve as a field station for long-term studies of natural populations.

The museum's active curatorial departments are: Anthropology, Birds, Botany, Herpetology (Amphibians & Reptiles), Invertebrate Paleontology, Invertebrate Zoology, Mammals, Minerals, Mollusks (Malacology), and Vertebrate Paleontology. These departments work collaboratively under strategic centers created to re-frame how the museum leverages its research, exhibitions, and public programming to meet the challenges and issues of today. In late 2013, however, the museum's parent organization and interim administration eliminated multiple scientific positions, seriously reducing its capacity to conduct original research.

Scientific publications

Carnegie Museum of Natural History publishes scholarly journals and books including Annals of Carnegie Museum, which offers peer-reviewed articles in organismal biology, earth sciences, and anthropology; Bulletin of Carnegie Museum of Natural History, offering monographs or collections of related papers from symposia; and Special Publications of Carnegie Museum, documenting special topics or areas of research.

See also
 Carnegie Museums of Pittsburgh
 Carnegie Collection
 List of museums in Pennsylvania
 Andrey Avinoff
 Rudyerd Boulton
 Andrew Carnegie
 Benjamin Preston Clark
 Mary R. Dawson
 Carl H. Eigenmann
 John Bell Hatcher
 William Jacob Holland
 Lion Attacking a Dromedary
 Bradley C. Livezey
 M. Graham Netting
 Arnold Edward Ortmann
 Albert Schwartz
 Richard Shine
 James L. Swauger
 Walter Edmond Clyde Todd
 Richard Vogt

References

External links 

 
 Carnegie Museums
 Coleman J. Goin 
 LeRoy Kershaw Henry 
 Kenneth C. Parkes 

 
Andrew Carnegie
Dinosaur museums in the United States
Egyptological collections in the United States
Institutions accredited by the American Alliance of Museums
Museums established in 1896
Museums in Pittsburgh
Natural history museums in Pennsylvania
Paleontology in Pennsylvania
Tourist attractions in Pittsburgh